Cylindrocystis is a genus of algae belonging to the family Mesotaeniaceae.

The species of this genus are found in Europe and America.

Species:

Cylindrocystis angulatum 
Cylindrocystis cylindrospora 
Cylindrocystis diplospora 
Cylindrocystis minutissima 
Cylindrocystis obesa 
Cylindrocystis splendida

References

Zygnematales
Charophyta genera